Ramsey East railway station was a railway station in Ramsey, Cambridgeshire, which is now closed.
It opened on 16 September 1889, and closed to passenger traffic on 22 September 1930, and to freight traffic on 17 September 1956. The site is now occupied by the west side of Bury Road Industrial Estate, and a new housing development aptly called Signal Road and The Sidings.
It was the terminus of a branch line connected via Warboys railway station to Somersham, where it joined the main Great Eastern Railway line between St Ives and March, which at its upper end towards March is now occupied by the route A141 between Chatteris and March.

References

External links
 Ramsey East station on navigable 1946 O. S. map
 Ramsey East station on Subterranea Britannica

Disused railway stations in Cambridgeshire
Former Great Northern and Great Eastern Joint Railway stations
Railway stations in Great Britain opened in 1889
Railway stations in Great Britain closed in 1930
Ramsey, Cambridgeshire